Leitz may refer to several German companies:

Esselte Leitz GmbH & Co KG, founded by Louis Leitz in 1896, a German manufacturer of office products
Louis Leitz (1846–1918), German inventor and founder of Esselte Leitz GmbH & Co KG
Leitz GmbH & Co. KG, founded by Albert Leitz in 1876, a German manufacturer of machine tooling for wood and plastics
Ernst Leitz GmbH, founded by Ernst Leitz, a former German firm now divided into three independent companies: 
Leica Camera, manufacturer of cameras
Leica Geosystems, manufacturer of geodetic equipment
Leica Microsystems, manufacturer of microscopes and owner of the Leica brand